Andrew Yorke may refer to:

 Andy Yorke (born 1972), English musician 
 Andrew Yorke (triathlete) (born 1988), Canadian triathlete